The Kharagpur–Bankura–Adra line is part of Mednipur, Bankura, Purulia district. It links Kharagpur to Adra and Bankura in Eastern India, and also serves as a major freight line for transporting iron ore, coal and steel products to Haldia Port.

History
The Kharagpur–Midnapur branch line was opened in 1901. The Midnapore–Jharia extension of the Bengal Nagpur Railway, passing through Bankura District, was opened around 1903–04.

Electrification
The Adra–Bheduasol sector was electrified in 1997–98, and the Bheduasol–Salboni sector in 1998–99.

References 

5 ft 6 in gauge railways in India
Rail transport in West Bengal